The Jean Monnet Prize for European Integration is an award for individuals or groups having contributed to supporting or strengthening European integration through a project they designed and implemented.

Presentation 
The prize aims at honouring the memory and life achievements of Jean Monnet, one of the pioneers and founding fathers of the European Community and the first honorary European citizen. The award is endowed with 1,500 euros and is presented annually by the French non-governmental organisation EuropeanConstitution.eu on 9 November, anniversary of Jean Monnet's birth.

In 2018 and 2019, the prize was awarded under the patronage of the European Commission. Since 2019, it has received the patronage of the European Parliament and been organised in partnership with pro-European associations.

Prize winners 
 Jean Monnet Prize 2021
 Prize winner: Youth Cluster, a Portuguese NGO sharing experience and opportunities for youths to promote the single market as a tool for integration and shared prosperity
 Second place: MeetEU, a pan-European discussion community
 Third place: the Mepassistant, a Twitch channel about the European Union
 Jean Monnet Prize 2020
 Prize winner: Metropole - Vienna in English for Home is Where the Herz is
 Second place: Mia Europo
 Third place: Voters Without Borders campaign
 Jean Monnet Prize 2019
 Prize winner: ZEIT ONLINE for Europe Talks in cooperation with Arte, Der Standard, Financial Times and others
 Second place: University of Tirana for The Albanian society towards full integration into the European family 
 Third place: Toi d'Europe
 Jean Monnet Prize 2018
 Prize winner: #FreeInterrail campaign, by Vincent-Immanuel Herr and Martin Speer
 Second place: Political Critique by European Alternatives and Krytyka Polityczna
 Third place: UE Lib'

References

External links 
 Jean Monnet Prize for European Integration Official website of the prize.
 EuropeanConstitution.eu Official website of the association.

European awards
Jean Monnet